Mary Pradd (died November 1876) often known as Old Mary Pradd, sometimes Mary Pratt, was an English woman murdered in The Borough, London in 1876.

Pradd was photographed by John Thomson a few weeks before her death and appeared in his 1877 book Street Life in London.

Adult life 
Pradd was married to tinker called Lamb and she travelled around with Lamb and along with other men, including Mr Gamble, Edward Roland. Lamb and Pradd had a daughter named Harriet Lamb.

Pradd was socialising with friends in Battersea when she was photographed by John Thomson in Kent Street, London, a few weeks before her death. The photograph appeared in his 1877 book Street Life in London.

She was known to over-consume alcohol.

Death 
Pradd died in November 15 or 16 1876 at the age of 55 years of a haemorrhage from a stab wound that occurred while sharing a room with her friends Gamble and Roland who were fully dressed and asleep at the time of her death. Roland and Gamble were initially suspected of being involved in her death, but a jury found insufficient evidence to find them guilty of any crime. Pradd was found dead on the room's floor, fully dressed, with a three-quarter-inch long laceration to her body.

References

External links 

 ‘That’s old Mary Pradd, wot was murdered in the Borough’, History Hack Blog, 2012

1876 deaths
Deaths by stabbing in the United Kingdom
People from London
1876 murders in the United Kingdom